Bruno Agustín Díaz Bittner (born 31 July 1995) is an Argentine professional footballer who plays as a midfielder.

Career
Díaz's senior career began with Huracán. He soon moved to Tiro Federal on loan. After appearances in the 2014 Torneo Federal B, which they concluded with promotion to Torneo Federal A, Díaz scored one goal in ten matches across the 2015 campaign. They were subsequently relegated back down to tier four, with Díaz going on to take his overall tally for them to forty-five games and ten goals. In June 2018, after Tiro Federal signed him permanently, Díaz agreed terms with Primera B Nacional side Olimpo. Darío Bonjour selected Díaz for his professional bow on 16 September versus Ferro Carril Oeste.

Díaz terminated his Olimpo contract on 29 May 2020.

Career statistics
.

References

External links

1995 births
Living people
Sportspeople from Buenos Aires Province
Argentine footballers
Association football midfielders
Torneo Federal A players
Primera Nacional players
Club Atlético Huracán de Ingeniero White players
Olimpo footballers